Governor Lee may refer to:

Andrew E. Lee (1847–1934), 3rd Governor of South Dakota
Blair Lee III (1916–1985), acting Governor of Maryland
Bill Lee (Tennessee politician) (born 1959), 50th Governor of Tennessee
Fitzhugh Lee (1835–1905), 40th Governor of Virginia
FitzRoy Henry Lee (1699–1750), Commodore Governor of the Colony of Newfoundland from 1735 to 1737
H. Rex Lee (1910–2001), Governor of American Samoa from 1961 to 1967 and from 1977 to 1978
Henry Lee III (1756–1818), 9th Governor of Virginia
J. Bracken Lee (1899–1996), 9th Governor of Utah
Thomas Lee (Virginia colonist) (1690–1750), de facto Governor of Virginia from 1749 to 1750 
Thomas Sim Lee (1745–1819), Governor of Maryland from 1779 to 1783 and from 1792 to 1794